The Grand Island Central School District is a New York State public school district that serves the town of Grand Island in Erie County. The district consists of 5 schools–3 elementary schools, a middle school, and a high school. The middle and high schools share the same address and building. From 2013 to 2017, the district underwent a $58 million renovation, dubbed the "Capital Project" locally. This project included improvements to the district's lighting, air conditioning, auditoriums, gymnasiums, wireless Internet, as well as the addition of new academic wings. Grand Island is known regionally for their music program, and was designated for their community excellence in 2012-2016. More recently, mostly due to the capital project, Grand Island has also become more involved in state and regional technology-related activities.

Administration 
The district offices are located at 1100 Ransom Road in Grand Island. The current superintendent is Brian Graham.

Selected former superintendents 
Previous assignment and reason for departure denoted in parentheses
Veronica E. Connor–1947-1973 (Superintendent-Principal - Charlotte Sidway Elementary School, retired)
Oscar J. Pultz–1973-1979
Robert C. Courtemanche–1979-1986 (Superintendent - Central Falls School District, named Superintendent of Middletown Central School District)
Robert J. McCarthy [interim]–1986
Lee J. Cravotta–1986-1991 (Principal - Schalmont Middle School, named Superintendent of Oswego City School District)
Merton L. Haynes [interim]–1991-1992 (Interim Superintendent - East Aurora Union Free School District, resigned)
Paul D. Fields–1992-2002 (Assistant Superintendent - Alden Central School District, retired)
Vincent J. Coppola [interim]–2002 (Executive Director - Western New York Educational Service Council at the University at Buffalo, returned to position)
Thomas Ramming–2002-2006 (Assistant Superintendent for Human Resources - Williamsville Central School District, retired)
Lawrence J. Zacher [interim]–2006-2007 (Interim Superintendent - Springville-Griffith Institute Central School District, named Interim Superintendent of Owen D. Young Central School)
Robert J. Christmann–2007-2013 (Superintendent - Newark Central School District, retired)
Paul G. Hashem [interim]–2013 (Interim Principal - Amsdell Heights Middle School, named Interim Superintendent of Frontier Central School District)
Teresa M. Lawrence–2013-2016 (Assistant Superintendent for Curriculum and Instruction - Clarence Central School District, contract not renewed)
Brian Graham; 2016–Present

List of schools
Grand Island Senior High School (New York) (Built in 1963)
Veronica E. Connor Middle School (Built between 1967 and 1969)
Huth Road Elementary School (Built in 1958)
William Kaegebein Elementary School (Built in 1952)
Charlotte Sidway School (Built in 1936, enlarged in 1947 and 1950)

References

External links
 Grand Island Central School District

Education in Erie County, New York
School districts in New York (state)